Tobyhanna may refer to the following places in Pennsylvania in the United States:

Tobyhanna, Pennsylvania, in Coolbaugh Township, Monroe County
Tobyhanna Army Depot, a United States Army installation in Tobyhanna Township
Tobyhanna Creek, a tributary of the Lehigh River
Tobyhanna State Park, in Monroe County
Tobyhanna Township, Monroe County, Pennsylvania, in Monroe County